Soarelui may refer to one of two neighborhoods in Romania:

Soarelui, Satu Mare
Soarelui, Timișoara